Brachionus calyciflorus is a planktonic rotifer species occurring in freshwater. It is commonly used as a model organism in toxicology, ecology and evolutionary biology.
Its advantages include the small size and short generation time (average generation time of B. calyciflorus is around 2.2 days at 24 °C).

Reproduction
Brachionus calyciflorus normally reproduces by cyclical parthenogenesis. 
Transitions to obligate parthenogenesis have been described. Obligate parthenogens were homozygous for a recessive allele, which caused inability to respond to the chemical signals that normally induce sexual reproduction in this species.

Species complex
Like the Brachionus plicatilis cryptic species complex Brachionus calyciflorus seems also to be a species complex consisting of more than one species.

References

Brachionidae